Samuel Henry Armstrong (April 9, 1855 – May 15, 1916) was an Ontario farmer and political figure. He represented Muskoka in the Legislative Assembly of Ontario from 1912 to 1916 as a Conservative member.

He was born in Churchill, County Fermanagh, Ireland, the son of Lennon Armstrong, was educated in Enniskillen and came to Canada in 1872. In 1883, he married Emma Pratt. He was also a cattle dealer. Armstrong served on the council for Victoria County and was the first mayor of Bracebridge, serving in that post for 11 years.

References

External links 

1855 births
1916 deaths
Irish emigrants to Canada (before 1923)
Progressive Conservative Party of Ontario MPPs
Mayors of places in Ontario
Politicians from County Fermanagh